"Do You Want Me" is a song by American R&B-hip hop group Salt-N-Pepa, released in February 1991 as the third single from their 1990 album, Blacks' Magic. It reached  21 on the US Billboard Hot 100 and charted at No. 5 on the UK Singles Chart. The song also peaked at No. 9 in Portugal, No. 16 in the Netherlands, and No. 19 in Australia.

Charts

Weekly charts

Year-end charts

Certifications

References

1990 songs
1991 singles
FFRR Records singles
Next Plateau Entertainment singles
Salt-N-Pepa songs
Songs written by Hurby Azor